WFLR (1570 AM) is a radio station broadcasting a local news and country music format from studios in Penn Yan, New York. Licensed to Dundee, New York, United States, the station is owned by Finger Lakes Radio Group, Inc. and features programming from ABC Radio and Local Radio Network.

References

External links
Finger Lakes Daily News
http://www.fybush.com/NERW/2008/080922/nerw.html#ny

FLR
Radio stations established in 1984